Copelatus guadelupensis is a species of diving beetle. It is part of the genus Copelatus in the subfamily Copelatinae of the family Dytiscidae. It was described by Legros in 1948.

References

guadelupensis
Beetles described in 1948